This list is of the Historic Sites of Japan located within the Prefecture of Kagoshima.

National Historic Sites
As of 28 December 2022, thirty-four Sites have been designated as being of national significance.

Prefectural Historic Sites
As of 1 May 2022, fifty-two Sites have been designated as being of prefectural importance.

Municipal Historic Sites
As of 1 May 2022, a further six hundred and seventy-six Sites have been designated as being of municipal importance.

See also

 Cultural Properties of Japan
 List of Places of Scenic Beauty of Japan (Kagoshima)
 List of Cultural Properties of Japan - paintings (Kagoshima)
 Reimeikan, Kagoshima Prefectural Center for Historical Material

References

External links
  Cultural Properties in Kagoshima Prefecture

Kagoshima Prefecture
 Kagoshima